Ron und Tanja is a German television series. It originally aired as the ZDF Christmas series  between 25-30 December 1990.

See also
List of German television series

References

External links
 

1990 German television series debuts
1990 German television series endings
German children's television series
Television shows set in Berlin
German-language television shows
ZDF original programming